Lucia Zedner, FBA (born 20 February 1961) is a British legal scholar, who is Professor of Criminal Justice at the University of Oxford and a senior fellow of All Souls College, Oxford.

Biography
Zedner obtained her doctorate from Nuffield College Oxford (1984–1989), became a Member of the Centre for Criminology (1988), and a Prize Research Fellow. She later became a lecturer in Law at the London School of Economics where she was, beginning in 1991, assistant director of the Manheim Centre for Criminology and Criminal Justice. In 1994, Zedner returned to Oxford to become a Law Fellow at Corpus Christi College and rejoined the Centre for Criminology. She held a two-year British Academy Research Readership from 2003 to 2005. She was awarded the title of reader in 1999 and of professor of criminal justice in 2005, and in 2012 was elected as a fellow of the British Academy.

Publications
Zedner's teaching and research interests include penal theory, comparative criminology, victims, security, risk and anti-terrorist policy. Some of Zedner's publications, collaborations, with reviews, include:
 Women, Crime and Custody in Victorian England, (1991)
Journal of Interdisciplinary History, Spring, 1994, vol. 24, no. 4, p. 711–712.
Albion: A Quarterly Journal Concerned with British Studies, Winter, 1992, vol. 24, no. 4, p. 683–684.
The American Journal of Legal History, Jan., 1993, vol. 37, no. 1, p. 112–113.
Review, Law and History Review, Spring, 1996, vol. 14, no. 1, p. 128–131.
 Child Victims in the Criminal Justice System (with Jane Morgan, 1992)
Social Legal Studies Little 2 (1): 118.  Social Legal Studies
The Modern Law Review, Jul., 1993, vol. 56, no. 4, p. 611–613.
 The Criminological Foundations of Penal Policy, co-edited with Andrew Ashworth (2003)
 Criminal Justice (2004)
D. Downes, British Society of Criminology Newsletter
Security London: Routledge, 2009.

ResearchGate, the social networking site for scientists and researchers, lists 39 publications by Lucia Zedner.

References

External links
 University of Oxford; Faculty of Law; Professor Lucia Zedner; a profile.
 Oxford University Press,Academic section, Lucia Zender

Living people
Alumni of Nuffield College, Oxford
Fellows of Nuffield College, Oxford
Fellows of Corpus Christi College, Oxford
British legal scholars
Academics of the London School of Economics
Legal scholars of the University of Oxford
Fellows of the British Academy
1961 births
Fellows of All Souls College, Oxford